In molecular biology, quantitation of nucleic acids is commonly performed to determine the average concentrations of DNA or RNA present in a mixture, as well as their purity. Reactions that use nucleic acids often require particular amounts and purity for optimum performance. To date, there are two main approaches used by scientists to quantitate, or establish the concentration, of nucleic acids (such as DNA or RNA) in a solution. These are spectrophotometric quantification and UV fluorescence tagging in presence of a DNA dye.

Spectrophotometric analysis 

One of the most commonly used practices to quantitate DNA or RNA is the use of spectrophotometric analysis using a spectrophotometer. A spectrophotometer is able to determine the average concentrations of the nucleic acids DNA or RNA present in a mixture, as well as their purity.

Spectrophotometric analysis is based on the principles that nucleic acids absorb ultraviolet light in a specific pattern. In the case of DNA and RNA, a sample is exposed to ultraviolet light at a wavelength of 260 nanometres (nm) and a photo-detector measures the light that passes through the sample. Some of the ultraviolet light will pass through and some will be absorbed by the DNA / RNA. The more light absorbed by the sample, the higher the nucleic acid concentration in the sample. The resulting effect is that less light will strike the photodetector and this will produce a higher optical density (OD)

Using the Beer–Lambert law it is possible to relate the amount of light absorbed to the concentration of the absorbing molecule. At a wavelength of 260 nm, the average extinction coefficient for double-stranded DNA is 0.020 (μg/ml)−1 cm−1, for single-stranded DNA it is 0.027 (μg/ml)−1 cm−1, for single-stranded RNA it is 0.025 (μg/ml)−1 cm−1 and for short single-stranded oligonucleotides it is dependent on the length and base composition. Thus, an Absorbance (A) of 1 corresponds to a concentration of 50 μg/ml for double-stranded DNA. This method of calculation is valid for up to an A of at least 2. A more accurate extinction coefficient may be needed for oligonucleotides; these can be predicted using the nearest-neighbor model.

Calculations 

The optical density   is generated from equation:

Optical density= Log (Intensity of incident light / Intensity of Transmitted light)
 
In practical terms, a sample that contains no DNA or RNA should not absorb any of the ultraviolet light and therefore produce an OD of 0
 
Optical density= Log (100/100)=0

When using spectrophotometric analysis to determine the concentration of DNA or RNA,  the Beer–Lambert law is used to determine unknown concentrations without the need for standard curves. In essence, the Beer Lambert Law makes it possible to relate the amount of light absorbed to the concentration of the absorbing molecule. The following absorbance units to nucleic acid concentration conversion factors are used to convert OD to concentration of unknown nucleic acid samples:
 
A260 dsDNA = 50 µg/ml 
 
A260 ssDNA = 33 µg/ml
 
A260 ssRNA = 40 µg/ml

Conversion factors 

When using a 10 mm path length,  simply multiply the OD by the conversion factor to determine the concentration. Example,  a 2.0 OD dsDNA sample corresponds to a sample with a 100 µg/ml concentration.

When using a path length that is shorter than 10mm, the resultant OD will be reduced by a factor of 10/path length.   Using the example above with a 3 mm path length,   the OD for the 100 µg/ml sample would be reduced to 0.6.   To normalize the concentration to a 10mm equivalent,  the following is done:

0.6 OD X (10/3) * 50 µg/ml=100 µg/ml

Most spectrophotometers allow selection of the nucleic acid type and path length such that resultant concentration is normalized to the 10 mm path length which is based on the principles of Beer's law.

A260 as quantity measurement 

The "A260 unit" is used as a quantity measure for nucleic acids. One A260 unit is the amount of nucleic acid contained in 1 mL and producing an OD of 1. The same conversion factors apply, and therefore, in such contexts:

1 A260 unit dsDNA = 50 µg
1 A260 unit ssDNA = 33 µg
1 A260 unit ssRNA = 40 µg

Sample purity (260:280 / 260:230 ratios) 

It is common for nucleic acid samples to be contaminated with other molecules (i.e. proteins, organic compounds, other). The secondary benefit of using spectrophotometric analysis for nucleic acid quantitation is the ability to determine sample purity using the 260 nm:280 nm calculation. The ratio of the absorbance at 260 and 280 nm (A260/280) is used to assess the purity of nucleic acids. For pure DNA, A260/280 is widely considered ~1.8 but has been argued to translate - due to numeric errors in the original Warburg paper - into a mix of 60% protein and 40% DNA. The ratio for pure RNA A260/280 is ~2.0. These ratios are commonly used to assess the amount of protein contamination that is left from the nucleic acid isolation process since proteins absorb at 280 nm.

The ratio of absorbance at 260 nm vs 280 nm is commonly used to assess DNA contamination of protein solutions, since proteins (in particular, the aromatic amino acids) absorb light at 280 nm. The reverse, however, is not true — it takes a relatively large amount of protein contamination to significantly affect the 260:280 ratio in a nucleic acid solution.

260:280 ratio has high sensitivity for nucleic acid contamination in protein:

260:280 ratio lacks sensitivity for protein contamination in nucleic acids (table shown for RNA, 100% DNA is approximately 1.8):

This difference is due to the much higher mass attenuation coefficient nucleic acids have at 260 nm and 280 nm, compared to that of proteins. Because of this, even for relatively high concentrations of protein, the protein contributes relatively little to the 260 and 280 absorbance. While the protein contamination cannot be reliably assessed with a 260:280 ratio, this also means that it contributes little error to DNA quantity estimation.

Contamination identification 

Examination of sample spectra may be useful in identifying that a problem with sample purity exists.

Other common contaminants 

 Contamination by phenol, which is commonly used in nucleic acid purification, can significantly throw off quantification estimates. Phenol absorbs with a peak at 270 nm and a A260/280 of 1.2. Nucleic acid preparations uncontaminated by phenol should have a A260/280 of around 2. Contamination by phenol can significantly contribute to overestimation of DNA concentration.
 Absorption at 230 nm can be caused by contamination by phenolate ion, thiocyanates, and other organic compounds. For a pure RNA sample, the A230:260:280 should be around 1:2:1, and for a pure DNA sample, the A230:260:280 should be around 1:1.8:1.
 Absorption at 330 nm and higher indicates particulates contaminating the solution, causing scattering of light in the visible range. The value in a pure nucleic acid sample should be zero.
 Negative values could result if an incorrect solution was used as blank. Alternatively, these values could arise due to fluorescence of a dye in the solution.

Analysis with fluorescent dye tagging 

An alternative method to assess DNA and RNA concentration is to tag the sample with a Fluorescent tag, which is a fluorescent dye used to measure the intensity of the dyes that bind to nucleic acids and selectively fluoresce when bound (e.g. Ethidium bromide). This method is useful for cases where concentration is too low to accurately assess with spectrophotometry and in cases where contaminants absorbing at 260 nm make accurate quantitation by that method impossible. The benefit of fluorescence quantitation of DNA and RNA is the improved sensitivity over spectrophotometric analysis. Although, that increase in sensitivity comes at the cost of a higher price per sample and a lengthier sample preparation process.

There are two main ways to approach this. "Spotting" involves placing a sample directly onto an agarose gel or plastic wrap. The fluorescent dye is either present in the agarose gel, or is added in appropriate concentrations to the samples on the plastic film. A set of samples with known concentrations are spotted alongside the sample. The concentration of the unknown sample is then estimated by comparison with the fluorescence of these known concentrations. Alternatively, one may run the sample through an agarose or polyacrylamide gel, alongside some samples of known concentration. As with the spot test, concentration is estimated through comparison of fluorescent intensity with the known samples.

If the sample volumes are large enough to use microplates or cuvettes, the dye-loaded samples can also be quantified with a fluorescence photometer. Minimum sample volume starts at 0.3 μl 

To date there is no fluorescence method to determine protein contamination of a DNA sample that is similar to the 260 nm/280 nm spectrophotometric version.

See also
Nucleic acid methods 
Phenol–chloroform extraction
Column purification
Protein methods

References

External links
 IDT online tool for predicting nucleotide UV absorption spectrum
 Ambion guide to RNA quantitation
 Hillary Luebbehusen, The significance of 260/230 Ratio in Determining Nucleic Acid Purity (pdf document)
 double stranded, single stranded DNA and RNA quantification by 260nm absorption, Sauer lab at OpenWetWare
 Absorbance to Concentration Web App @ DNA.UTAH.EDU
 Nucleic Acid Quantification Accuracy and Reproducibility

Spectroscopy
Biochemistry methods
Nucleic acids